Evart High School is a high school located in Evart, Michigan. The athletic teams are known as the wildcats.

External links
Official website

Public high schools in Michigan
Schools in Osceola County, Michigan